Jock Blair (died May 2020) was an Australian television writer, producer, director and production executive.

He began in the industry as Graham Kennedy’s assistant on In Melbourne Tonight and stayed for five years. He then became a writer, and wrote scripts for the TV show Homicide. He was producer of The Box and later produced The Sullivans, Bluey and Skyways. In the 1980s he worked as head of production for the South Australian Film Corporation.

In the 1990s he produced series such as Paradise Beach, and worked as a production executive at Screen Queensland.

References

External links

Year of birth missing
2020 deaths
Australian television producers
Australian screenwriters